This is a timeline of the relations between Hungary and the European Union (EU), since the transition in Hungary in 1989-90.

Before accession

1989 – For supporting the transition in Hungary and Poland, the EU launched the Phare programme.
1991 – European agreements with Hungary, Poland and Czechoslovakia (free trade, possibility of future membership) (16 December).
1993 – The Council of the European Union defined eligibility criteria (“Copenhagen criteria”) for joining the EU (Copenhagen, 21–22 June).
1994 – Hungary submitted its request for joining the EU (1 April).
1995 – Neighbouring Austria joined the EU (1 January).
1997 – The Council decided to launch accession negotiations with Eastern European candidate countries (Luxembourg, 12–13 December).
1998 – Accession negotiations between the EU and Hungary started.
1999 – The EU reformed the Phare programme for supporting the preparation for the accession and the structural funds, and launched the ISPA and SAPARD programmes for supporting the preparation for the Cohesion Fund and the rural development pillar of the Common Agricultural Policy.
2002 – Accession negotiations between the EU and Hungary concluded.
2003 – Hungary held referendum on joining the EU (12 April). 84% of the valid votes supported the membership.

After accession

2004–2010 

2004
 Hungary joined the EU, together with Poland, the Czech Republic, Slovakia and 6 other countries (1 May). 
 The first member states (UK, Ireland and Sweden) opened their labour markets for the new member states (the accession treaty allowed up to 7 years transition period). 
 Excessive deficit procedure launched against Hungary (5 July).

2007
 Neighbouring Romania joined the EU and neighbouring Slovenia joined the Eurozone (1 January). 
 Hungary – together with neighbouring Slovakia and Slovenia among others – joined the Schengen Area (21 December).

2008
 The EU, the International Monetary Fund and the World Bank provided EUR 20 billion bailout package for Hungary (of which the EU provided EUR 6.5 billion) (4 November).

2009Slovenia 
 Neighbouring Slovakia joined the Eurozone (1 January).

2010–present 

2011
 Hungary was responsible for the presidency of the Council (1 January-30 June). 
 Prime Minister Viktor Orbán likened Brussels to Moscow for the first time (15 March).
 The last member states (Germany and Austria) opened their labour markets for the new member states (the accession treaty allowed up to 7 years transition period). 
 Hungary requested a second (precautionary) financial assistance from the EU and the IMF (21 November). Later, Hungary was able to finance itself through the market and did not request further assistance.
 In the meantime, Hungary drafted a new law on the central bank. The European Commission assessed that the new law can threaten the bank’s independence and President José Manuel Barroso asked Prime Minister Viktor Orbán to withdraw the legislation (20 December). However, the Hungarian Parliament adopted the new law (30 December).

2012
 The European Commission launched infringement procedure against Hungary over the independence of its central bank, data protection authority and judiciary (17 January).
 With the presence of Viktor Orbán and José Manuel Barroso, the European Parliament had a harsh debate on recent political developments in Hungary (18 January).
 Pro-government demonstration („peace march”) held in Budapest, with the slogan „We will not be a colony” (21 January).
 The European Commission was satisfied with changes to central bank statute, but referred the cases of the data protection authority and the judiciary to the European Court of Justice (25 April). Later, the Court found in both cases that Hungary has infringed EU law.

2013
 Excessive deficit procedure against Hungary closed (21 June). 
 Neighbouring Croatia joined the EU (1 July). 
 Hungary repaid the 2008 bailout credit to the IMF (12 August).

2014
 After winning the election, Viktor Orbán announced to build illiberal democracy within the EU (26 July).

2015
 As a response to the European migrant crisis, Hungary started to build a border barrier (15 June).
 There were tens of thousands of migrants in Hungary, and the country lost control (4 September).
 With qualified majority, the Council established a temporary and exceptional mechanism to relocate 120.000 refugees from Greece and Italy to other member states (22 September). Hungary, Slovakia, the Czech Republic and Romania voted against the plan. Hungary and Slovakia asked the European Court of Justice to annul the decision, but in 2017 the Court dismissed the actions.
 In Poland, the Eurosceptic Law and Justice party won the election and formed government becoming a key ally to Viktor Orbán (25 October).

2016
 Hungary repaid the 2008 bailout credit to the EU (6 April). 
 Hungary held referendum on the EU’s refugee relocation plans (2 October). 98% of the valid votes rejected the relocation, however, with 44% turnout the result cannot be considered valid. 
 The European Anti-Fraud Office (OLAF) found serious irregularities in the Budapest metro line project funded by the EU and linked mainly to Socialist governments.

2017
 The Hungarian government launched a domestic campaign entitled “Let’s stop Brussels!”, suggesting that the “Brussels” wants to force Hungary to let in illegal migrants (March).
 As Hungary, the Czech Republic and Poland didn’t implement the 2015 Council Decision on relocation of refugees, the European Commission launched infringement procedure against the three Member States.(14 June).
 The European Commission referred the cases to the European Court of Justice (7 December). Later, the Court found that the three member states have failed to fulfil their obligations under EU law.

2018
 OLAF found serious irregularities in projects funded by the EU and run by a company once co-owned by the son-in-law of Viktor Orbán. The Hungarian prosecution launched probe but dropped it soon.
 Significant deviation procedure launched against Hungary (18 June; the first such procedure was launched the previous year against Romania). 
 The European Parliament initiated to trigger Article 7 procedure against Hungary for persistently breaching the EU’s founding values (report by MEP Judith Sargentini, 12 September; the first such procedure was initiated the previous year against Poland, by the European Commission).

2019
 Ahead of the European Parliament election, the Hungarian government launched a domestic campaign entitled “You too have the right to know what Brussels is planning!”, suggesting that the Commission had a secret plan to promote migration. The Commission rejected the claims (28 February).
 The European People’s Party suspended the membership of Fidesz (20 March).
 The European Parliament rejected the Hungarian commissioner designate Laszlo Trocsanyi (as well as the Romanian commissioner designate Rovana Plumb) (30 September).

2020
 The European Council agreed to link the EU budget to rule of law conditionality, but left details open (17-21 July).
 The Commission published the first reports on rule of law in the Member States (20 September).
 Hungary and Poland threatened to veto the EU budget if linked to rule of law conditionality, but finally a compromise was agreed (10 December).

See also
 Timeline of European Union history
 History of the European Union since 2004
 Enlargement of the European Union

References

External links
 The history of the European Union

Modern history of Hungary
European Union
History of the European Union